Somewhere in My Lifetime is the third studio album by singer Phyllis Hyman. It was released by Arista Records in 1979, becoming Hyman's debut Arista release (see 1979 in music).

Six of the tracks were first used on her previous album on Buddah, with three tracks produced by Theodore Life and the title track, co-produced and arranged by Barry Manilow, added for the Arista release.  The album was reissued on CD in 2008 through BMG Special Products; the release features two bonus tracks.

Track listing 
Side one:
 "Kiss You All Over" (Mike Chapman, Nicky Chinn) - 5:14
 "Somewhere in My Lifetime" (Jesus Alvarez) - 3:30
 "Lookin' for a Lovin'" (Phyllis Brown, Barry Goldberg) - 2:58
 "The Answer Is You" (Mark Radice) - 5:09 (Previously issued in 1978 on Sing a Song)
 "So Strange" (Theodore Life, Billy Green) - 4:40
Side two:
 "Gonna Make Changes" (Phyllis Hyman) - 3:58 (Previously issued in 1978 on Sing a Song)
 "Living Inside Your Love" (Skip Scarborough, Renee Taylor) - 6:14 (Previously issued in 1978 on Sing a Song)
 "Be Careful (How You Treat My Love)" (Garry Glenn) - 4:12 (Previously issued in 1978 on Sing a Song)
 "Soon Come Again" (Larry Alexander, Sandy Torano) - 3:36 (Previously issued in 1978 on Sing a Song)
 "Here's That Rainy Day" (Jimmy Van Heusen, Johnny Burke) - 3:02 (Previously issued in 1978 on Sing a Song)

CD bonus tracks 
  "Kiss You All Over" - 12" Version (Mike Chapman, Nicky Chinn) - 6:18
  "So Strange" - 12" Version (Theodore Life, Billy Green) - 9.02

Personnel 
Phyllis Hyman - vocals
 Leo Adamian - drums
 Larry Alexander - backing vocals
 Monty Alexander - piano
 Bob Babbitt - bass guitar
 Rubens Bassini - percussion
 Diva Gray - backing vocals
 Gordon Grody - backing vocals
 Onaje Allan Gumbs - piano
 Herbie Hancock - piano
 Azar Lawrence - alto saxophone
 Will Lee - bass guitar
 Theodore Life - guitar, backing vocals
 Steve Love - guitar
Jimmy Maelen - percussion
 Al Martinez - backing vocals
Sid McGinnis - guitar
 Nate Neblett - drums
 Sam Peake - backing vocals
 Sylvia Pichler - backing vocals
 Steve Robbins - synthesizer, piano
 John Rowin - guitar
 Louis Russell - guitar
 Robert Russell - bass guitar
Paul Shaffer - piano
 Jocelyn Shaw - backing vocals
 Michael Stanton - piano
 Ernest Straughter - piano
 Bill Summers - percussion
 Sybil Thomas - backing vocals
Ronnie Zito - drums

Production 
 Producer: Larry Alexander and Skip Scarborough (Tracks 4, 6 and 8–10); Theodore Life (Tracks 1, 3 and 5); Barry Manilow and Ron Dante (Track 2)
 Arranger: Monty Alexander, Dave Crawford, Onaje Allan Gumbs, Skip Scarborough
 Engineers: Don Cody, Michael DeLugg, Rick Rowe, William Wittman
 Mastering: Cozy Noda and Jack Skinner

References

External links
 

1979 albums
Arista Records albums
Phyllis Hyman albums
Albums produced by Ron Dante
Pop albums by American artists